The men's 3000 metres steeplechase at the 2006 European Athletics Championships were held at the Ullevi on August 9 and August 11.

Finland's Keskisalo takes surprise gold after two injury-filled years. He ran behind the whole pack until the last lap, during which he sprinted on the back straight to take the win ahead of Spain's José Luis Blanco and France's Bouabdellah Tahri.

Medalists

Schedule

Results

Heats
First 4 in each heat (Q) and the next 4 fastest (q) advance to the Final.

Final

External links
Results

Steeplechase
Steeplechase at the European Athletics Championships